Dundonald Castle is a ruined castle near Killean, Kintyre, Scotland. It was a stronghold of Clan Donald, but later passed to the Campbells.

Notes

References

Ruined castles in Argyll and Bute
Clan Donald
Kintyre